Alberto Isaac (18 March 1923 – 9 January 1998) was a Mexican freestyle swimmer and later a film director and screenwriter. He competed in the 1948 Summer Olympics and the 1952 Summer Olympics.

In 1969, he directed the documentary film The Olympics in Mexico which was nominated for an Academy Award for Best Documentary Feature. In 1980 he was a member of the jury at the 30th Berlin International Film Festival. In 1987, he was a member of the jury at the 15th Moscow International Film Festival.

References

External links
 

1923 births
1998 deaths
Ariel Award winners
Best Director Ariel Award winners
Mexican male freestyle swimmers
Olympic swimmers of Mexico
Swimmers at the 1948 Summer Olympics
Swimmers at the 1951 Pan American Games
Swimmers at the 1952 Summer Olympics
Swimmers from Mexico City
Film directors from Mexico City
Writers from Mexico City
Pan American Games bronze medalists for Mexico
Pan American Games medalists in swimming
Competitors at the 1946 Central American and Caribbean Games
Competitors at the 1950 Central American and Caribbean Games
Central American and Caribbean Games gold medalists for Mexico
Central American and Caribbean Games medalists in swimming
20th-century Mexican screenwriters
20th-century Mexican male writers
Medalists at the 1951 Pan American Games